Women in Their Beds is a short story collection by Gina Berriault. It received the 1996 National Book Critics Circle Award and the 1997 PEN/Faulkner Award for Fiction.

References

American short story collections
Jewish American short story collections
National Book Critics Circle Award-winning works
1996 short story collections
PEN/Faulkner Award for Fiction-winning works
Counterpoint (publisher) books